See also List of nonlinear partial differential equations and List of linear ordinary differential equations.

A–F
{|class="wikitable" style="background: white; color: black; text-align: left"
|-style="background: #eee"
!Name
!Order
!Equation
!Applications
|-
|Abel's differential equation of the first kind 
|1
|
|Mathematics
|-
|Abel's differential equation of the second kind 
|1
|
|Mathematics
|-
|Bellman's equation or Emden-Fowler's equation
|2
|
|Mathematics
|-
|Bernoulli equation 
|1
|
|Mathematics
|-
|Besant-Rayleigh-Plesset equation 
|2
|
|Fluid dynamics
|-
|Blasius equation 
|3
|
|Blasius boundary layer
|-
|Chandrasekhar equation 
|2
|
|Astrophysics
|-
|Chandrasekhar's white dwarf equation 
|2
|
|Astrophysics
|-
|Chrystal's equation 
|1
|
|Mathematics
|-
|Clairaut's equation 
|1
|
|Mathematics
|-
|D'Alembert's equation 
|1
|
|Mathematics
|-
|Darboux equation 
|1
|
|Mathematics
|-
|De Boer-Ludford equation 
|2
|
|Plasma physics
|-
|Duffing equation 
|2
|
|Oscillators
|-
|Emden equation 
|2
|
|Astrophysics
|-
|Euler's differential equation 
|1
|
|Mathematics
|-
|Falkner–Skan equation 
|3
|
|Falkner–Skan boundary layer
|}

G–K
{|class="wikitable" style="background: white; color: black; text-align: left"
|-style="background: #eee"
!Name
!Order
!Equation
!Applications
|-
|Ivey's equation 
|2
|
|
|-
|Jacobi's differential equation 
|1
|
|Mathematics
|-
|Kiddler equation 
|2
|
|Flow through porous medium
|-
|Krogdahl equation 
|2
|
|Stellar pulsation
|}

L–Q
{|class="wikitable" style="background: white; color: black; text-align: left"
|-style="background: #eee"
!Name
!Order
!Equation
!Applications
|-
|Lane–Emden equation 
|2
|
|Astrophysics
|-
|Langmuir equation 
|2
|
|Environmental Engineering
|-
|Langmuir-Blodgett equation 
|2
|
|
|-
|Langmuir-Boguslavski equation 
|2
|
|
|-
|Liñán's equation 
|2
|
|Combustion
|-
|Painlevé I transcendent 
|2
|
|Mathematics
|-
|Painlevé II transcendent 
|2
|
|Mathematics
|-
|Painlevé III transcendent 
|2
|
|Mathematics
|-
|Painlevé IV transcendent 
|2
|
|Mathematics
|-
|Painlevé V transcendent 
|2
|
|Mathematics
|-
|Painlevé VI transcendent 
|2
|
|Mathematics
|-
|Poisson-Boltzmann equation 
|2
|
|Statistical Physics
|}

R–Z
{|class="wikitable" style="background: white; color: black; text-align: left"
|-style="background: #eee"
!Name
!Order
!Equation
!Applications
|-
|Rayleigh equation 
|2
|
|Hydrodynamic stability
|-
|Riccati equation 
|1
|
|Mathematics
|-
|Stuart–Landau equation 
|1
|
|Hydrodynamic stability
|-
|Thomas–Fermi equation 
|2
|
|Quantum mechanics
|-
|Van der Pol equation 
|2
|
|Oscillators
|}

References

 
Equations, differential, ordinary, nonlinear